In and Out of Love may refer to:
 In and Out of Love (Cheri Dennis album)
 In and Out of Love (Mary Wells album)
 "In and Out of Love" (Bon Jovi song)
 "In and Out of Love" (The Supremes song)
 "In and Out of Love" (Armin van Buuren song)
 In and Out of Love, an art installation by Damien Hirst